Assad-Allah Imani, (or Asadullah Imani) (1947 – 7 May 2018) was an Iranian Twelver Shia scholar, who was a member of assembly of experts, and also the Imam of Prayer in Shiraz.

Family and life 
Assad-Allah Imani was born in the city of Kazeroun (Fars province) in a religious family, and his family were known of "professing Islam". His ancestor was Karbalayi-Assadollah, and his father was Muhammad Sadeq Imani. Imani passed his elementary-school at the city of Kazeroun; he also passed the first-three years of Hawzah primary lessons by the side of his city's scholars. In 1962, he departed for Qom, and educated by the sides of scholars such as Mohammad Fazel Lankarani, Naser Makarem Shirazi and Ja'far Sobhani.

Teachers 
Among his teachers, are:
 Mohammad-Taqi Sotudeh
 Salavati
 Hossein Shab-Zendedar
 Mohammad Fazel Lankarani
 Naser Makarem Shirazi
 Ja'far Sobhani
 Mostafa Etemadi
 Seyyed Mohammad-Baqer Soltani Tabatabai
 Seyyed Mohammad Mohaqeq Damad
 Mirza Hashem Amoli
 Seyyed Mohammad-Reza Golpaygani
 Yahya Ansari
 Abdollah Javadi-Amoli
 Abdu-Rahim Rabani Shirazi
Etc.

Works 
This Shia cleric, presented several compilations, amongst of them are:
 A thesis on Khums
 A thesis on Erth (inheritance)
 A thesis in Taqqiah
 A thesis in Amr-be-Ma'ruf
 Participation in set/collection of Tafsir-Nemouneh
And so on.

See also
 Assembly of Experts
 List of provincial representatives appointed by Supreme Leader of Iran
List of Ayatollahs
List of members in the First Term of the Council of Experts

References 

Representatives of the Supreme Leader in the Provinces of Iran
Representatives of the Supreme Leader
People from Kazerun
Members of the Assembly of Experts
Iranian Shia clerics
1947 births
2018 deaths
People from Shiraz